Enter Inspector Duval  is a low budget 1961 British crime film directed by Max Varnel and starring Anton Diffring, Diane Hart and Mark Singleton.

Plot
A French policeman, Inspector Duval, is brought to London to help his British colleagues crack a case. The investigation concerns the murder of a socialite during a jewel theft. However, it turns out Inspector Duval has ulterior motives. It was based on a story by Jacques Monteux.

Cast
 Anton Diffring - Inspector Duval
 Diane Hart - Jackie
 Mark Singleton - Inspector Wilson
 Charles Mitchell - Brossier
 Aiden Grennell - Mark Sinclair
 Susan Hallinan - Doreen
 Charles Roberts - Charley
 Patrick Bedford - Sergeant Hastings
 James Fitzgerald - Mario

References

External links

1961 films
1961 crime films
Films directed by Max Varnel
British crime films
1960s English-language films
1960s British films